Dasypogon hookeri, commonly known as pineapple bush, is a species of shrub in the family Dasypogonaceae native to Western Australia.

References

Dasypogonaceae
Endemic flora of Western Australia
Taxa named by James Drummond (botanist)